The following is a list of Canadian sports personalities.

Olympic athletes 
Alex Baumann, Sudbury, swimmer
Josh Binstock (born 1981), volleyball player
Patrick Chan, Ottawa
Victor Davis, Guelph
Andre De Grasse, Scarborough/Markham
Lori Dupuis, Cornwall
 Dave Edge (born 1954), British-Canadian Olympic long-distance runner
 Terry Farnsworth (born 1942), Olympic judoka
Mark Fawcett, Nelson, British Columbia
 Shaul Gordon (born 1994), Canadian-Israeli Olympic sabre fencer
Alex Harvey, Saint-Ferréol-les-Neiges, cross-country skier
Wendy Lumby, Calgary, Alberta
Rosie MacLennan, King City
Conlin McCabe, Brockville
Scott Moir, London
Dylan Moscovitch, medallist pairs skater
Garth Pischke, indoor beach volleyball player
Sam Schachter, Olympic beach volleyball player
Elvis Stojko, Richmond Hill
Adam van Koeverden, Oakville
Tessa Virtue, London
Simon Whitfield, Kingston
Curt Harnett, Thunder Bay - cyclist

Australian rules football 
Mike Pyke (born 1984), former Canada rugby union international and first Canadian to play for an AFL premiership (championship) team

Automobile racing 

Patrick Carpentier
Ron Fellows, 24 Hours of Le Mans GTS class winner
Scott Goodyear
James Hinchcliffe
Nicholas Latifi
Raphaël Lessard
Greg Moore (1975–1999)
Bruno Spengler, DTM winner
Lance Stroll (born 1998), Italian F4 champion in 2014, Toyota Racing Series champion in 2015, and 2016 FIA European Formula 3 champion
Alex Tagliani
Paul Tracy CART Champion 2003
Gilles Villeneuve (1950–1982)
Jacques Villeneuve (born 1971), son of Gilles, Formula 1 World Champion 1997, Indy 500 Winner 1995, CART Champion 1995
Robert Wickens

Baseball 

Jason Bay, 3x MLB All Star, 2004 NL Rookie of the Year
Érik Bédard
Reggie Cleveland
Rhéal Cormier
Jesse Crain, All Star
Tom Daly, Major League Baseball (MLB) player and coach
Ryan Dempster, 2x MLB All Star
Scott Diamond
Jeff Francis
Éric Gagné, 3x MLB All Star, Cy Young Award winner (2003)
Aaron Guiel
Rich Harden
Blake Hawksworth
Ferguson Jenkins, 3x MLB All Star, first Canadian to gain election to National Baseball Hall of Fame (1991)
George Kottaras
Pete Laforest
Joseph Lannin, owner of the Boston Red Sox who signed Babe Ruth
Brett Lawrie (born 1990)
Adam Loewen
Russell Martin, 4x All Star
Scott Mathieson
Kirk McCaskill
Justin Morneau, 2006 American League MVP, 4x All Star
Mike Nickeas
Pete Orr
Terry Puhl, MLB All Star, Canadian Baseball Hall of Fame
Paul Quantrill, All Star
Ryan Radmanovich
Chris Reitsma
Goody Rosen, MLB All-Star outfielder, Canadian Baseball Hall of Fame
George Selkirk, succeeded Babe Ruth in right field for NY Yankees
Matt Stairs (born 1968)
Adam Stern (born 1980)
Mark Teahen
Scott Thorman
Larry Walker, first Canadian to win Most Valuable Player Award (MVP) of Major League Baseball (1997), 5x All Star
Nigel Wilson
Jeff Zimmerman, All Star

Current players 
John Axford
Freddie Freeman, 5x All Star
Vladimir Guerrero Jr
Josh Naylor
Tyler O'Neill
James Paxton, pitched a no hitter in 2018
Nick Pivetta (born 1993)
Zach Pop (born 1996)
Abraham Toro (born 1996)
Joey Votto (born 1983), 2010 National League MVP, 6x MLB All Star
Andy Yerzy (born 1998), catcher/first baseman

Basketball 
Current NBA players

Nickeil Alexander-Walker
Dalano Banton
 RJ Barrett
 Khem Birch
 Chris Boucher
Oshae Brissett
Dillon Brooks
Nate Darling
Luguentz Dort
Shai Gilgeous-Alexander
Cory Joseph
Trey Lyles
Jamal Murray
Kelly Olynyk
Dwight Powell
Joshua Primo
Tristan Thompson
Andrew Wiggins
Current WNBA players
Natalie Achonwa
Kayla Alexander
Tammy Sutton-Brown
Kia Nurse

Playing in overseas leagues
Caleb Agada 
 Joel Anthony
 Kris Joseph
 Levon Kendall
 Andrew Nicholson
 Kevin Pangos
 Andy Rautins
 Ari Rosenberg
 Robert Sacre
 Simisola Shittu (born 1999)
 Nik Stauskas
 Shona Thorburn
 Lindell Wigginton

Playing in other North American professional leagues
 Anthony Bennett, first Canadian to be drafted #1 overall in the NBA Draft
 Sim Bhullar, notable as the first person of Indian descent to play in the NBA
 Tyler Ennis
 Keanau Post

Coaches
Jay Triano, first Canadian-born coach

Former NCAA Division I players awaiting professional play
 Nirra Fields
 Ruth Hamblin
 Kyle Wiltjer

Retired
Jordan Adams
Norm Baker, inducted into Canadian Basketball Hall of Fame in 1979
Rowan Barrett 
Hank Biasatti, inducted into the Canadian Basketball Hall of Fame in 2001
Ron Crevier
Samuel Dalembert
Stacey Dales, former WNBA player; currently a host on the NFL Network
Rick Fox, won three NBA Championship rings in 2000, 2001 and 2002 as a member of the Los Angeles Lakers
Stewart Granger
Lars Hansen
Bob Houbregs, inducted into the Basketball Hall of fame in 1987
Todd MacCulloch
Jamaal Magloire
James Naismith (1861–1939), teacher; invented the game of basketball
Steve Nash, 2005, 2006 NBA MVP, 2007 MVP runner-up
Leo Rautins
Mike Smrek
Gino Sovran
Ernie Vandeweghe
Bill Wennington, won three championships with the Chicago Bulls (1996, 1997 and 1998)
Jim Zoet

Biathlon 

Myriam Bédard (born 1969), Olympic gold medallist
Zina Kocher (born 1982)

Bobsleigh 

Lascelles Brown, Olympic silver medal, 2006
Vic Emery, Olympic gold medal, 1964
Kaillie Humphries, Olympic gold medal, 2010
Pierre Lueders, Olympic gold medal, 1998 and silver medal, 2006
David MacEachern, Olympic gold medal, 1998
Heather Moyse, Olympic gold medal, 2010

Boxing 

 Trevor Berbick, former WBC heavyweight champion
 Maxie Berger, world champion junior welterweight
Tommy Burns (1881–1955), world heavyweight boxing champion
George Chuvalo
Willie DeWitt
Yvon Durelle
Al Foreman, won the Canadian lightweight title, British Boxing Board of Control British lightweight title, and British Empire lightweight title
Freddy Fuller, light welterweight
Arturo Gatti, former WBC world Super Lightweight champion
Otis Grant, WBC Super Middleweight international champion
Moe Herscovitch, middleweight, Olympic bronze medal winner
 Kirk Johnson
Sam Langford
Mark Leduc
Lennox Lewis, grew up in Canada; competed for Canada in the Olympics in 1988, winning a gold medal
Eric Lucas, former WBC world champion (1999–2001) Supermiddleweight
 Sammy Luftspring, welterweight boxing champion, Canada's Sports Hall of Fame
Steve Molitor, former IBF Super Bantamweight champion, record of 33–3 (12 KOs) as of September 2012
Tokunbo Olajide, light middleweight boxer  
Jean Pascal, former IBO, WBC, Ring Magazine Light Heavyweight Champion of the World
 Donovan Ruddock, heavyweight
 Bert Schneider, welterweight, Olympic gold medal winner
Shane Sutcliffe, Canadian former heavyweight champion, defeated former world champion "Neon" Leon Spinks by 8-round decision in 1994

Cricket 
Ashish Bagai
Ian Billcliff
Rizwan Cheema
John Davison
Navneet Dhaliwal 
Nikhil Dutta
Romesh Eranga
Jeremy Gordon
Dillon Heyliger
Abraash Khan
Nicholas Kirton
Nitish Kumar
Junaid Siddiqui
Ravinderpal Singh
Hamza Tariq 
Rodrigo Thomas
Srimantha Wijeratne
Saad Bin Zafar

Cross-country skiing 

Shirley Firth
Drew Goldsack (born 1981), cross country skier, 2x Olympian
Brian McKeever (born 1979), multiple Paralympic gold and silver medals
Robin McKeever (born 1973), multiple Paralympic gold and silver medals
Esther Miller
Beckie Scott, Olympic gold medal, 2002
Irvin Servold

Curling 

Sherry Anderson
Dawn Askin
Matt Baldwin
Cheryl Bernard
Jan Betker
Suzanne Birt
Marilyn Bodogh
Terry Braunstein, World Championship silver medalist
Kerry Burtnyk
Garnet Campbell
Chelsea Carey
Jim Cotter
Andrea Crawford
Mark Dacey
Lyall Dagg
Mabel DeWare
Don Duguid
John Epping
Randy Ferbey
Rick Folk
Rob Fowler
Kerry Galusha
Hec Gervais
Alison Goring
Ab Gowanlock
Brad Gushue
Al Hackner
Jenn Hanna
Mike Harris
Richard Hart
Ben Hebert
Guy Hemmings
Amber Holland
Rachel Homan
Heather Houston
Glenn Howard
Russ Howard
Gordon Hudson
Brad Jacobs
Colleen Jones
Jennifer Jones
Marc Kennedy
Cathy King
Shannon Kleibrink
Jamie Koe
Kevin Koe
Brent Laing
Connie Laliberte
Penny LaRocque
Marie-France Larouche
Kelley Law
Kaitlyn Lawes
Stefanie Lawton
Ed Lukowich
Jack MacDuff
Murray Macneill
Cliff Manahan
Kevin Martin
Greg McAulay
Krista McCarville
Mike McEwen
Joyce McKee
Orest Meleschuk
Jean-Michel Ménard
Sherry Middaugh
Wayne Middaugh
Marj Mitchell
Linda Moore
John Morris
Barry Naimark, world champion
Dave Nedohin
Heather Nedohin
Ron Northcott
Jill Officer
Scott Patterson
Vic Peters
Vera Pezer
Ernie Richardson
Pat Ryan
Pat Sanders
Craig Savill
Sandra Schmirler (1963–2000)
Kelly Scott
Julie Skinner
Heather Smith-Dacey
Lindsay Sparkes
Jeff Stoughton
Billy Walsh
Ed Werenich
Pappy Wood

Cycling 
Steve Bauer
Ryder Hesjedal, 7th overall at the 2010 Tour de France, winner of 2012 Giro d'Italia
Andreas Hestler
Clara Hughes, two-sport athlete, six Olympic medals total
Alison Sydor

Disc sports 
Ken Westerfield, disc sport (Frisbee) pioneer, athlete, showman, promoter

Fencing

 Peter Bakonyi (1933–1997), Hungarian-born Canadian Olympic foil and épée  fencer
Marc-Antoine Blais Bélanger (born 1995), épée
Alex Cai (born 2000), foil
Alanna Goldie (born 1994), foil,  2015 Pan American Games gold medal in team foil
Shaul Gordon (born 1994), sabre, three Pan American Games medals
Eleanor Harvey (born 1995), foil; won gold medal at the 2015 Pan American Games in women's team foil event
Bertram Markus (1899-1900), foil and épée
Rhoda Martin (1919-1998), foil
Eli Schenkel (born 1992), foil
Shelley Steiner (born 1961), foil, Olympic fencer
Igor Tikhomirov (born 1963), épée
Maximilien Van Haaster (born 1992), foil, bronze medal at the 2013 Pan American Fencing Championships
Gerry Wiedel (born 1933), foil and épée

Figure skating 

Barbara Berezowski (born 1954)
Stan Bohonek (born 1952)
Shae-Lynn Bourne and Victor Kraatz - Ice Dancing, World Champions, 2003
Kurt Browning
Patrick Chan
Toller Cranston
Lloyd Eisler (born 1963)
Donald Jackson (born 1940)
Victor Kraatz (born 1971)
Elizabeth Manley
Kirsten Moore-Towers
Dylan Moscovitch, Olympic silver medallist pair skater
Brian Orser
Cynthia Phaneuf
Jennifer Robinson
Joannie Rochette
Louis Rubenstein, (pre-Olympic) World Championship gold, World Figure Skating Hall of Fame
Jamie Salé and David Pelletier - Pairs, gold medal 2002 Winter Olympics
Emanuel Sandhu
Barbara Ann Scott, Olympic gold medal
Elvis Stojko
Barbara Underhill and Paul Martini - Pairs, World Champions, 1984
Tessa Virtue and Scott Moir - Ice Dancing, Gold Medal 2010 Winter Olympics, Ice Dancing Silver Medal 2014 Winter Olympics, Ice Dancing Gold Medal 2018 Winter Olympics 
Barbara Wagner and Robert Paul, pairs
Tracey Wainman (born 1967)
Constance Wilson-Samuel (1908-1963)

Football 

Roger Aldag, retired CFL offensive lineman
Oshiomogho Atogwe, Philadelphia Eagles free safety
Jamie Boreham, retired CFL kicker
Doug Brown, retired CFL and NFL defensive tackle
Nate Burleson, Detroit Lions wide receiver
Noah Cantor, DT, Canadian Football League
Steve Christie, NFL placekicker
Pinball Clemons, current Vice Chair for Toronto Argonauts, born in the United States
Lionel Conacher, former CFL halfback
Royal Copeland
Peter Dalla Riva
Vince Danielsen, retired CFL quarterback
Jason David, New Orleans Saints
Rocky Dipietro
Ray Elgaard
Don Fuell
Tony Gabriel
Russ Jackson
Teyo Johnson, free agent, NFL tight end
Danny Kepley
Joe Krol
Normie Kwong
Rueben Mayes, former NFL running back
Angelo Mosca, retired CFL defensive tackle
Eddie Murray, retired NFL placekicker
Bronko Nagurski (1908–1990), Chicago Bears legend, member of US Pro Football Hall of Fame
Dave Ridgway
Mark Rypien, former NFL quarterback
Dave Sapunjis
Annis Stukus, former CFL player and executive
Shaun Suisham, Pittsburgh Steelers placekicker
Mike Vanderjagt, retired placekicker for several CFL, NFL and Arena league teams
Troy Westwood

Golf 

Stephen Ames
Al Balding
Dave Barr
Jocelyne Bourassa
Dawn Coe-Jones
Corey Conners
Graham DeLaet
Gail Graham
Dan Halldorson
Adam Hadwin
David Hearn
Brooke Henderson
Lorie Kane
George Knudson
Stan Leonard
Jim Nelford
Moe Norman
Sandra Post
Ben Silverman, PGA Tour
Sandy Somerville
Nick Taylor
Mike Weir
Jennifer Wyatt
Richard "Dick" Zokol

Gymnastics 
Elfi Schlegel

Horse racing and equestrian sports 

Ted Atkinson, Hall of Fame jockey
Russell Baze (born 1958), Hall of Fame jockey; currently #2 winningest jockey in history
Big Ben, world show-jumping champion
Billyjojimbob, distinguished aged trotter
John Campbell, harness racing driver
Dance Smartly, Canadian Triple Crown, Breeders' Cup champion
Jim Day, Olympic equestrian gold medallist, champion thoroughbred trainer
Laetitia du Couëdic, equestrian rider
Stewart Elliott, thoroughbred racing jockey
Hervé Filion, harness racing driver
Sandy Hawley,  Hall of Fame thoroughbred jockey
John Hayes (1917–1998), harness racing driver
Johnny Longden (1907–2003), Hall of Fame jockey
Ian Millar (born 1947), owner and rider of Big Ben
Nijinsky II, last English Triple Crown winner
Northern Dancer, Canada's most successful and beloved race horse
Red Pollard (1909–1981), Seabiscuit's jockey
Strike Out, harness racing champion
Ron Turcotte (born 1941), Hall of Fame jockey of Secretariat
George Woolf (1910–1946), Hall of Fame jockey

Ice hockey 

Syl Apps (1915–1998)
Jean Beliveau (1931–2014)
Todd Bertuzzi (born 1975)
Mike Bossy (born 1957)
Jennifer Botterill, four Olympic medals
Ray Bourque (born 1960), five-time winner of the James Norris Memorial Trophy
Daryl Boyle
Martin Brodeur, more NHL wins than any other goaltender
Ross Brooks, NHL goaltender
 Hy Buller (1926–1968), NHL All-Star defenceman
 Michael Cammalleri, left wing (Calgary Flames)
Cassie Campbell
Don Cherry
Mike Craig
Sidney Crosby
 Jason Demers (born 1988), defenceman
Marcel Dionne
 Steve Dubinsky (born 1970), NHL center
Matt Duchene
Mathew Dumba
Bill Durnan
Phil Esposito (born 1942)
Tony Esposito
Mike Fisher, Peterborough
 Kaleigh Fratkin (born 1992), professional ice hockey defenseman
 Mark Friedman (born 1995), NHL defenseman
Danny Gallivan, play-by-play announcer
Bernie Geoffrion, "Boom-Boom", developed the booming slap shot, second player in NHL history to score 50 goals in a season
Doug Gilmour
Claude Giroux,  Hearst, Ontario
Danielle Goyette
Wayne Gretzky (born 1961), "The Great One", holds most NHL scoring records
George Hainsworth
Glenn Hall
Gizzy Hart, NHL left wing
Doug Harvey, seven-time winner of the James Norris Memorial Trophy
Dany Heatley
Jayna Hefford, five Olympic medals
Paul Henderson, scored winning goal in 1972 Canada/USSR match
Foster Hewitt (1902–1985), play-by-play announcer
Corey Hirsch (born 1972), NHL goaltender
Joshua Ho-Sang (born 1996), forward
Tim Horton (1930-1974)
Bronco Horvath (1930–2019)
Gordie Howe (1928-2016), held most NHL scoring records before Gretzky
Kelly Hrudey
Jack Hughes (born 2001)
Bobby Hull (born 1939), the "Golden Jet"; first player in the NHL to score more than 50 goals in a season
Brett Hull (born 1964), star for several teams, son of Bobby Hull
 Zach Hyman (born 1992), NHL ice hockey left wing/center
Jarome Iginla
Peter Ing, NHL goaltender
Joe Ironstone, NHL goaltender
Curtis Joseph, Keswick
Nazem Kadri, NHL centre
Max Kaminsky, NHL centre
Paul Kariya
Duncan Keith
Red Kelly
Ted Kennedy
Dave Keon
 Max Labovitch (1924–2018), NHL right wing
Reggie Leach
Guy Lafleur
 Brendan Leipsic, forward
Mario Lemieux (born 1965), player/owner of the Pittsburgh Penguins
Devon Levi (born 2001), Northeastern Huskies, Canada men's national junior ice hockey team, goaltender
 Alex "Mine Boy" Levinsky (1910–1990), defenceman
Eric Lindros
Roberto Luongo
Brooks Macek
Ron MacLean
Frank Mahovlich
Mark Messier (born 1961), starred alongside Gretzky during Edmonton Oilers dynasty and Captain of New York Rangers when they won the Cup in 1994
Stan Mikita
Howie Morenz, voted top athlete of the first half of the 20th century
Bill Mosienko
Rick Nash
David Nemirovsky, NHL right wing
Rob Niedermayer
Scott Niedermayer
Sarah Nurse (born 1995), Olympian
Bobby Nystrom (born 1952), NHL right wing
Bobby Orr (born 1948), considered by many to be the best ever, revolutionized the role of a defenseman becoming the first to win the scoring title (twice)
Caroline Ouellette, four Olympic medals
Bernie Parent
Cherie Piper
 Bob Plager (1943–2021), defense
Jacques Plante (1929–1986), pioneered active defensive play and use of face masks by goalies
Denis Potvin (born 1953)
Manon Rhéaume (born 1972), first woman to play in a men's professional game
Maurice Richard (1921–2000), "The Rocket", first player to score 50 goals in a season
Brad Richards, Stanley Cup and Lady Byng trophy winner
Larry Robinson, Hall of Fame defenseman
 Samuel Rothschild (1899–1987)
Patrick Roy
Jim Rutherford, Beeton
Kim St-Pierre, goaltender for Canada's Women's National Hockey team from 1999 to 2011
Joe Sakic
Derek Sanderson
Serge Savard
Terry Sawchuk
Luke Schenn
Patrick Sharp
 Eliezer Sherbatov (born 1991), Canadian-Israeli left wing
Eddie Shore
Darryl Sittler
Sami Jo Small
Trevor Smith (born 1985), NHL centre
Eric Staal, Thunder Bay
Jordan Staal, Thunder Bay
Marc Staal, Thunder Bay
Steven Stamkos, Markham
Ronnie Stern (born 1967), NHL right wing
Vicky Sunohara
Frederick Cyclone Taylor
John Tavares, Toronto Maple Leafs
Joe Thornton, NHL centre (San Jose Sharks)
Jonathan Toews, captain (Chicago Blackhawks)
Josh Tordjman, NHL centre
Raffi Torres, Toronto
Mike Veisor (born 1952), NHL goaltender
Stephen Weiss (born 1983), center (Florida Panthers)
Hayley Wickenheiser, member of Canada's Women's National Hockey team from 1995, played in Finland's men's professional league (Mestis), five Olympic medals
Brian Wilks (born 1966), NHL centre
 Bernie Wolfe (born 1951), NHL goaltender
Steve Yzerman (born 1965), GM of Tampa Bay Lightning, long-time captain of Detroit Red Wings
Chick Zamick (1926–2007)
 Larry "Rock" Zeidel (1928–2014), NHL defenceman

Judo 
 Mark Berger, Olympic silver and bronze medals (heavyweight)
 Terry Farnsworth (born 1942), Olympic judoka

Lacrosse 

Gary Gait
Paul Gait
John Grant, Jr.
Bill Isaacs
Chris Levis
Gaylord Powless
Geoff Snider
Man Afraid Soap
John Tavares
Jim Veltman

Mixed martial arts 

Patrick Côté
Nick Denis
Gary Goodridge
Jonathan Goulet
T. J. Grant
Mark Hominick
Denis Kang
David Loiseau
Rory MacDonald
Carlos Newton, former UFC welterweight champion
Georges St-Pierre, former UFC welterweight and middleweight champion
Sam Stout

Multiple sports 
Lionel Conacher, played multiple sports and turned professional in ice hockey, Canadian football and lacrosse
Clara Hughes (born 1972), speed skating and cycling medallist in both summer and winter Olympics
Hayley Wickenheiser, known as being one of the best female ice hockey players in the world; also participated for Canada in the Olympics in softball

Professional rodeo 
 Earl W. Bascom, designer of hornless bronc saddle (1922) and bareback rigging (1924)

Professional wrestling 

Abdullah the Butcher (Lawrence Shreve) (born 1941)
Chris Benoit (1967–2007)
Traci Brooks (born 1975)
Don Callis (born 1969)
Christian Cage (Jason Reso) (born 1973)
Rene Dupree (Rene Goguen) (born 1983)
Earthquake (John Tenta) (1963–2006)
Edge (Adam Copeland) (born 1973)
Ronnie Garvin
Sylvain Grenier
 Hart wrestling family:
 Stu Hart (1915–2003), family patriarch married American Helen Smith and had twelve children
 Smith Hart (1948–2017)
 Bruce Hart (born 1950)
 Keith Hart (born 1951)
 Wayne Hart (born 1952)
 Dean Hart (1954–1990)
 Bret 'The Hitman' Hart (born 1957)
 Ross Hart (born 1960)
 Alison Hart, daughter of Stu and Helen married Canadian wrestler Ben Bassarab (born 1960)
 Diana Hart (born 1963), involved in 1990s WWE storylines, author of several wrestling books, and one-time wife of British wrestler Davey Boy Smith (1962–2002)
 Owen Hart (1965–1999)
 Teddy Hart (Edward Annis) (born 1980), son of Stu's daughter Georgia Hart and American wrestler B. J. Annis (born c. 1947)
 Natalya (Natalie Neidhart) (born 1982), daughter of Stu's daughter Ellie Hart and American wrestler Jim Neidhart (1955-2018), she is married to Tyson Kidd (TJ Wilson) (born 1980)
 David Hart Smith (Harry Smith) (born 1985), son of Diana Hart and Davey Boy Smith
 Brooke B. Hart, daughter of Alison Hart and Ben Bassarab married Pete Wilson (born 1985)
 Matt Hart (born 1994) son of Smith Hart
 Mike Hart (born 1982) stepson of Smith Hart
Chris Jericho (Chris Irvine) (born 1970)
Gail Kim (born 1976)
Kurrgan (Robert Maillet) (born 1969)
 Santino Marella (Anthony Carelli)
Rick Martel
 Kenny Omega (Tyson Smith) (born 1983)
Maryse Ouellet
Kevin Owens
Roddy Piper (Roderick Toombs) (1954-2015)
Bobby Roode (born 1978)
Jacques Rougeau
Raymond Rougeau
Tiger Ali Singh (born 1971)
Tiger Jeet Singh (born 1944)
Lance Storm (Lance Evers) (born 1969)
Trish Stratus (Patricia Stratigias) (born 1975)
Val Venis (Sean Morley) (born 1971)
Vampiro (Ian Hodgkinson) (born 1967)
Whipper Billy Watson (1915–1990)
Petey Williams (born 1981)
Eric Young (born 1980)
Sami Zayn (born 1984)

Rowing, kayaking 

Louis Ginglo 
Silken Laumann
Marnie McBean
Lesley Thompson, five Olympic medals
Adam van Koeverden, Olympic gold medal winner in sprint kayaking

Rugby union 
Dan Baugh
Norm Hadley
Dave Moonlight
Gareth Rees
Kevin Tkachuk

Skeleton 

Jon Montgomery, Olympic gold medal, 2010
Jeff Pain, Olympic silver medal, 2006

Skiing 

Jean-Luc Brassard, freestyle ski, moguls, Olympic gold medal, 1994
Todd Brooker
The Crazy Canucks, a group of downhill racers who were extraordinarily successful in the late 1970s and early 1980s:
Jim Hunter
Dave Irwin
Dave Murray
Steve Podborski, Canada's only overall World Cup winner
Ken Read, the first Canadian male to win on the World Cup circuit
Michel Daigle, 1970s freestyle skiing pioneer 
Nancy Greene, alpine skiing, downhill, Olympic gold medal, 1968
Ann Heggtveit, world and 1960 Winter Olympics ski champion
Lewis Irving
Kathy Kreiner, alpine skiing, giant slalom, Olympic gold medal, 1976
Kerrin Lee-Gartner,  alpine skiing, downhill, Olympic gold medal, 1992
Brady Leman
Julia Murray
Manuel Osborne-Paradis, North Vancouver, British Columbia
TJ Schiller
Gerry Sorensen, alpine skiing, downhill, world champion, 1982
Don Stevens, alpine world ski champion and in the 1988 winter Olympics
Melanie Turgeon, alpine skiing, downhill, world champion, 1993
Lucille Wheeler, alpine world ski champion
Rhona and Rhoda Wurtele, alpine ski champions of the 1940s and 1950s

Snowboarding 
Calynn Irwin
Mark McMorris, Olympic bronze medallist
Ross Rebagliati, Olympic snowboarding champion
Maelle Ricker, Olympic gold medallist

Soccer (football) 

Alon Badat (born 1989), Israeli soccer player
Adam Braz, defender
Jim Brennan
Kadeisha Buchanan, multiple award-winning defender for national team
John Catliff, striker
Tomer Chencinski (born 1984), Israeli-Canadian goalkeeper
Alphonso Davies
Jonathan de Guzman, midfielder
Julian de Guzman, 2007 Gold Cup MVP
Dwayne De Rosario, 2007 MLS Cup MVP
David Edgar
Rob Friend, forward
Gottfried Fuchs (1889–1972), German (national team)-Canadian Olympic football player
Daniel Haber, forward, Team Canada
Owen Hargreaves, England international
Junior Hoilett, winger
Charmaine Hooper
Jordyn Huitema, national team forward
Atiba Hutchinson, midfielder
Simeon Jackson, forward
Will Johnson, midfielder
Kaylyn Kyle, sports broadcaster and former national team midfielder
Karina LeBlanc, sports broadcaster and former national team goalkeeper
Bobby Lenarduzzi
Diana Matheson, national team midfielder
Kevin McKenna, Team Canada Captain
Erin McLeod, national team goalkeeper
Dale Mitchell, striker
Jimmy Nicholl, played for N. Ireland
Olivier Occéan
Pedro Pacheco
Paul Peschisolido
Nichelle Prince, national team forward
Quinn, national team defender
Tomasz Radzinski
Randy Samuel
Sophie Schmidt, national team midfielder
Christine Sinclair, world's all-time leader for international goals
Jacob Shaffelburg, winger
Paul Stalteri
John van't Schip, played for the Netherlands

Speed skating

Long track 

Susan Auch
Gaétan Boucher, four-time Olympic medallist, 1980, 1984
Lela Brooks
Sylvia Burka
Sylvie Daigle
Charles Gorman
Clara Hughes, six Olympic medals
Catriona Le May Doan
Christine Nesbitt,  Olympic gold medallist, 1000m long track, 2010
Frank Stack
Jeremy Wotherspoon, world record holder at 500m

Short track 

Guillaume Bastille, Olympic gold medallist, 2010
Isabelle Charest
Sylvie Daigle, Olympic gold medallist, 1992
Marc Gagnon, Olympic gold medallist, 1998 and 2002
Charles Hamelin, Olympic gold medallist, 2010
François Hamelin, Olympic gold medallist, 2010
Olivier Jean, Olympic gold medallist, 2010
Nathalie Lambert, Olympic gold medallist, 1992
Annie Perreault, Olympic gold medallist, 1992 and 1998
Kalyna Roberge

Squash 
Jonathon Power, the only North American squash player to attain the #1 world ranking
Graham Ryding

Swimming and diving 

Jennifer Abel
Alex Baumann, 1984 medley Olympic champion
Marilyn Bell, first person to swim Lake Ontario
Meaghan Benfeito
Sylvie Bernier, Canada's first gold medal in Olympic diving
Victor Davis (1964–1989), Olympic swimming champion
Alexandre Despatie, world diving champion
Émilie Heymans, four Olympic diving medals
Penny Oleksiak, seven Olympic medals
Dick Pound
Mark Tewksbury, Olympic gold medallist

Synchronized swimming 
Sylvie Fréchette
Carolyn Waldo

Tennis 

Françoise Abanda
 Dave Abelson
Felix Auger Aliassime, highest world ranking No. 8
Bianca Andreescu, highest world ranking No. 4
Carling Bassett-Seguso, highest world ranking No. 8
Vicki Berner (1945–2017), Tennis Canada Hall of Fame
Eugenie Bouchard, highest world ranking No. 5
Gabriela Dabrowski
Frank Dancevic
Leylah Annie Fernandez, highest world ranking No. 13
 Sharon Fichman, Israeli-Canadian, was Canada's Under-18 Indoor & Outdoor National girls champion, also won the doubles title, won the Australian Open and French Open junior doubles championships.
Helen Kelesi, highest world ranking No. 13
Jesse Levine, American-Canadian, won the U.S. Clay Court 14 Nationals singles championship, the USTA boys' 16s doubles championship, and the 2005 Wimbledon boys' doubles championship
Glenn Michibata
Daniel Nestor, highest world ranking in doubles #1
 Peter Polansky
Vasek Pospisil, highest world ranking No. 25
Mary Pierce, naturalized French
Milos Raonic, highest world ranking No. 3
Greg Rusedski, naturalized British
Denis Shapovalov, Israeli-Canadian, highest world ranking No. 10
Andrew Sznajder, highest world ranking No. 46
Aleksandra Wozniak, highest world ranking No. 21

Track and field 

Jamie Adjetey-Nelson (born 1984), decathlete and gold medallist at the 2010 Commonwealth Games
Dylan Armstrong (born 1981), shot putter, Pan American Games record, second at world championships
Donovan Bailey (born 1967), sprinter, former 100m world record holder
Simon Bairu (born 1983), distance runner, 2010 IAAF World Cross Country Championships
Bryan Barnett (born 1987), sprinter, 100m and 200m
Joël Bourgeois (born 1971), 3000 meter Steeplechase, 1996 and 2000 Olympics
Nathan Brannen (born 1982), 800m, 2009 World Championships
Pierre Browne (born 1980), sprinter, 100m in the Summer Olympics
Jared Connaughton (born 1985), sprinter, 100m and 200m
Reid Coolsaet born (1979), marathon runner, 2012 London Summer Olympics
Bruce Deacon (born 1966), marathon runner, 1996 and 2000 Olympics
Andre De Grasse (born 1994), sprinter, Rio 2016 Medallist: 100m Bronze, 200m Silver, and 4 × 100 m relay Bronze
Étienne Desmarteau (1873–1905), weight thrower, Olympic champion
Jerome Drayton (born 1945), marathon runner; three-time winner of the Fukuoka Marathon; Canadian marathon record holder since 1969; 1968 and 1976 Olympic Games
 Dave Edge (born 1954), British-Canadian Olympic long-distance runner
Phil Edwards, middle-distance runner, five Olympic bronze medals
Sam Effah (born 1988), sprinter, 100m
Alice Falaiye (born 1978), long jumper, gold medallist at the 2009 Pan American Games and 2010 Commonwealth Games
Perdita Felicien (born 1980), 2003 world champion in 100m hurdles
Nicole Forrester (born 1976), high jumper, gold medallist at the 2010 Commonwealth Games
Sultana Frizell (born 1984), hammer thrower, gold medallist at the 2010 Commonwealth Games
Phylicia George (born 1987), 100m hurdles
Eric Gillis born (1980), marathon runner, Summer Olympics: 2008 Beijing and London 2012 
 Sasha Gollish (born 1981), competitive runner, bronze medallist in the 2015 Pan American Games 1500m and gold medallist in the 2013 Maccabiah Games half-marathon
 Abby Hoffman, four-time Olympian (800-meter)
Matthew Hughes (born 1989), 3000m steeplechase, gold medallist at the 2015 Pan American Games, Rio 2016
Nikkita Holder (born 1987), 100m hurdles
Barbara Howard (1920–2017), sprinter, silver and bronze relay medalist at the 1938 British Empire Games
Harry Jerome (1940–1982), sprinter, bronze medallist in the 100m at the 1964 Summer Olympics
Ben Johnson (born 1961), sprinter, disqualified from Olympic gold medal for doping
Jennifer Joyce (born 1980), hammer thrower, silver medallist at the 2006 Commonwealth Games
Robert Kerr (1882–1963), sprinter, 1908 Summer Olympics medallist: a gold and a bronze
Michael LeBlanc (born 1987), sprinter, 2012 IAAF World Indoor Championships
Cameron Levins (born 1989), distance runner, inaugural Canadian to win the Bowerman Award (NCAA male athlete of the year); London 2012 Olympics
Priscilla Lopes-Schliep (born 1982), 100m hurdles, silver medallist at the 2009 World Championships
 Gordon Orlikow (born 1960), decathlon, heptathlon, and hurdles competitor, won medals in the 73rd Drake Relays, the 1981 Maccabiah Games and 1985 Maccabiah Games in Israel, and the 1987 Pan American Games, Athletics Canada Chairman, Canadian Olympic Committee member, Korn/Ferry International partner
George Orton (1873–1958), inaugural Canadian Olympics medallist
Hank Palmer (born 1985), sprinter, 2008 Summer Olympics
Bruno Pauletto (born 1954), shot putter
Sydney David Pierce, Olympic hurdler
Gary Reed (born 1981), 800m, silver medallist at the 2007 World Championships
Fanny Rosenfeld (1904–1969), runner & long jumper, world record (100-yard dash); Olympic medallist (4x100-m relay) and silver (100-m)
Scott Russell (born 1979), javelin thrower, 2001 World Championships, bronze medallist at the 2002 Commonwealth Games, 2008 Summer Olympics
Bruny Surin (born 1967), sprinter, tied with Donovan Bailey for Canadian 100m record
Brianne Theisen (born 1988), heptathlete, 2009 World Championships
Justyn Warner (born 1987), sprinter, 100m
Angela Whyte (born 1980), 100m hurdles, silver medallist at the 2007 and 2011 Pan American Games
Percy Williams (1908–1982), sprinter, double gold medallist at the 1928 Olympics, former world record holder in the 100m
Dylan Wykes (born 1983), marathon runner, 2009 World Championships and 2012 London Summer Olympics
Jessica Zelinka (born 1981), heptathlete and pentathlete, gold medallist at the 2007 Pan American Games

Triathlon 

Paula Findlay (born 1989), bronze medallist at the 2009 ITU World Championships, 2012 London Summer Olympics
Kyle Jones (born 1984), 2012 London Olympics
Brent McMahon (born 1980), silver at the 2007 Pan American Games, bronze at the 2011 Pan American Games, 2012 London Summer Olympics
Lionel Sanders (born 1988), winner of the 2017 ITU Long Distance Triathlon World Championships
Kathy Tremblay (born 1982), 2012 London Summer Olympics
Simon Whitfield (born 1975), gold at the 2000 Olympics and silver at the 2008 Olympics, competed at the 2012 London Summer Olympics

Water skiing
Chantal Singer, internationally ranked waterskier

Weightlifting 
Louis Cyr, weightlifter
The Great Antonio, strongman and wrestler

Wrestling 

 Andy Borodow (born 1969), Olympic wrestler, Maccabiah champion, Commonwealth champion
Garry Kallos (born 1956), Olympic light-heavyweight wrestler, Maccabiah champion, and sambo champion
Oleg Ladik (born 1971), Olympic wrestler
Fred Oberlander, world champion (freestyle heavyweight); Maccabiah champion
Herbert Singerman, Olympic wrestler
Howard Stupp (born 1955), Olympic wrestler
Ari Taub, Olympic Greco-Roman wrestler
David Zilberman, Olympic heavyweight wrestler

Bodybuilding Athletes 
Dayana Cadeau, Vancouver - bodybuilder
Cathy LeFrançois, Amqui, Quebec - bodybuilder
Chris Bumstead, Ottawa, Ontario - bodybuilder

Nationally recognized honour lists
Bobbie Rosenfeld Award (female only)
Canadian Olympic Hall of Fame
Canada's Athletes of the 20th Century
Lionel Conacher Award (male only)
List of members of Canada's Sports Hall of Fame
Lou Marsh Trophy
Velma Springstead Trophy (female only)

References

Further reading